Joshua (also known as The Devil's Child) is a 2007 American psychological thriller co-written and directed by George Ratliff. The film stars Sam Rockwell, Vera Farmiga and Jacob Kogan.

Joshua premiered at the 2007 Sundance Film Festival and was released on July 6, 2007, in the United States by Fox Searchlight Pictures. The film received favourable reviews from critics, with many praising the performances, atmosphere and the horror elements, but criticism for its plot and characters.

Plot
Brad and Abby Cairn are an affluent New York couple with two children. Their firstborn, a self-decided conservatively dressed 9-year-old, Joshua, is a child prodigy on the piano and demonstrates ability to such a degree that he thinks and acts old before his time.

Joshua gravitates toward his oblivious Uncle Ned as a close friend, but distances himself from his parents, particularly following the birth of his sister, Lily. As the days pass, bizarre events transpire as the house regresses from healthy and happy to strange and disorienting. As the baby's whines drive an already strained Abby to the point of a nervous breakdown, Joshua exhibits downright sociopathic behavior, while Brad finds he can't help his wife, do well at his demanding job, or match wits with his strange son.

Joshua kills the family's dog, but says he doesn't know what happened, then imitates his father's grief as if he himself is incapable of feeling sadness. He next causes a fight between his mother and paternal grandmother Hazel. Later, he convinces his mother to play hide-and-seek. As Abby counts, he takes his sister from her crib to hide with him, causing his mother to panic and pass out while searching for them, before he puts his sister back into the crib to make it look as though his mother was hallucinating.

Seeing that Abby is getting worse, Brad takes two weeks off from his job to look after her and the children. When he arrives home, Joshua has gone to the Brooklyn Museum with Lily and Hazel. Joshua frightens Hazel by describing the violent acts of Seth, the Egyptian God of Chaos. At home, Brad watches a videotape of Joshua making Lily cry on purpose in the middle of the night, realizing that Joshua is the one who has been making Lily cry incessantly at night. He arrives at the museum just in time to see Joshua attempt to push his sister down a flight of stairs. He stops when he is caught by Hazel but proceeds to push her down instead, killing her and disguising it as an accident. Brad confides in Ned that he thinks Joshua did it but Ned doesn't believe him. By this point, Abby has had a complete psychotic breakdown and been institutionalized.

That night, Brad installs a lock on his bedroom door and tells Joshua that his sister will be sleeping with him, fearing he will attempt to do something to Lily. He also brings Betsy, a psychologist, to meet Joshua. Betsy comes to the erroneous conclusion that Joshua is being abused, further frustrating Brad. Brad tells Joshua he is sending him away to a boarding school, causing Joshua to run away. When Brad arrives home, he immediately sees Joshua's school backpack on the kitchen floor. Brad calls out for Joshua numerous times while searching the residence for him, but his efforts are unsuccessful. Later in the evening Brad is laying with Lily on his bed lulling her to sleep. Brad then faintly hears Joshua crying, and he finds Joshua hiding in the kitchen. Joshua begged Brad not to send him away. Joshua wouldn't crawl out of his hiding place so Brad pulled him out, and Joshua cried out in pain. It was then that Brad discovered a large bruise on Joshua's back. Brad asked Joshua who gave him the bruise several times, and all Joshua would say was that he slipped.

The next morning, Brad and Joshua go for a walk with his sister, but Joshua steals her pacifier, causing her to cry. When Brad confronts him, Joshua begins to mock him, causing him to strike Joshua. Brad tries to apologize but Joshua further taunts him, driving Brad to beat his son in public, strengthening Joshua's case of abuse and sending Brad to jail for assault. It is indicated that Joshua also framed his father for tampering with Abby's medications, suggesting that Brad will spend the rest of his life in prison, leaving Ned to adopt Joshua and Lily.

In the last scene, Ned sits with Joshua at the piano and the two compose a song. Joshua sings about how his parents both will never be loved by anyone now, and that he only wanted to be with Ned and got rid of everyone else. Ned finally realizes what Joshua has done and looks at him with a disturbed glance.

Cast

Release
The film was directed by George Ratliff, who co-wrote the screenplay with David Gilbert. It was produced by Johnathan Dorfman and ATO Pictures, and was distributed Fox Searchlight Pictures and 20th Century Fox. The film was a special selection at the Sundance Film Festival in January 2007.

Joshua was given a limited release in the United States on July 6, 2007.

Music
Beethoven's Piano Sonata No. 12 (Funeral March movement) was used widely in the film, and was learned and played by 12-year-old Jacob Kogan. The soundtrack was written by Nico Muhly and was available to download via iTunes.

Reception

Box office
The film made $53,233 in its opening weekend from 6 screens, averaging $8,538 per theater. It made $482,355 domestically in the United States, and $237,613 in other territories for a total worldwide gross of $719,968.

Critical response
On Rotten Tomatoes the film has an average rating of 62%, based on 99 reviews, with an average rating of 6.3/10. The site's consensus reads, "Though Joshua is ultimately too formulaic, its intelligence and suspenseful buildup heighten the overall creep factor." On Metacritic, the film scored a 69 out of 100 rating, based on 25 critic reviews, indicating "generally favorable reviews".

Duane Byrge of The Hollywood Reporter said that the film was "a brilliant house-of-horror tale with Hitchcockian flare". Owen Gleiberman of Entertainment Weekly said that the film is "something vitally new... that has a cool and savvy fun with your fears" — he also noted that it is "a superbly crafted psychological thriller". Elizabeth Weitzman of New York Daily News wrote: "None of this would have worked without the ideal child, and Kogan, making his movie debut, gets a difficult role down perfectly. Ratliff avoids turning him into a typical bad seed, and shows the same restraint at nearly every turn. With deliberate pacing, well-placed scares, and a pitch-black sense of humor, Ratliff keeps us guessing until the stunner finish."

Maitland McDonagh of TV Guide gave the film 2.5 stars out of 4, writing: "Ratliff and co-screenwriter David Gilbert are clearly aiming for the highbrow suspense market rather than the down-and-dirty horror crowd, but their script's obviousness strips the story of suspense and turns it into a tedious slog to a predestined end." Mick LaSalle of the San Francisco Chronicle wrote: "Two things: the audience is ahead of the movie, and the movie never catches up. In the first scene we look at the kid, we look at the family and we get it. We get all there is to get. A strangely composed boy sits in his suit and tie, banging away at a Bartók piano piece for a school recital, while his parents ooh and aah over their newborn daughter. Joshua is a very bad kid, and he is going to do very bad things."

References

External links
 
 
 
 
 

2007 films
2007 independent films
2007 thriller films
2007 psychological thriller films
American psychological thriller films
Films about dysfunctional families
Films scored by Nico Muhly
Films set in New York City
Films shot in New York City
Fox Searchlight Pictures films
2000s English-language films
2000s American films